The , also known as the Kusatsu Aquatic Botanical Garden, is a botanical garden specializing in aquatic plants and best known for its extensive lotus display. Mizu-no-mori means "water forest" in Japanese.  It is located on Lake Biwa's southeastern shore on the Karasuma Peninsula in Oroshimo-cho, Kusatsu, Shiga, Japan, and open daily except Mondays. An admission fee is charged.

See also
 List of botanical gardens in Japan

References
 
 Photoguide article

Botanical gardens in Japan
Gardens in Shiga Prefecture
Kusatsu, Shiga